Nipomo (Chumash: Nipumuʔ) is a unincorporated town in San Luis Obispo County, California, United States. The population was 16,714 for the 2010 census and grew to 18,176 for the 2020 census.  For statistical purposes, the United States Census Bureau has defined Nipomo as a census-designated place (CDP).

Name
The name is the Spanish transliteration of the Obispeño Chumash place name Nipumuʔ, meaning "place of the big house"  or "village".

History 

The original settlers of Nipomo were the Chumash Indians, who have lived in the area for over 9,000 years. Rancho Nipomo (the Indian word ne-po-mah meant "foot of the hill") was one of the first and largest of the Mexican land grants in San Luis Obispo County.

William G. Dana of Boston, a sea captain travels led him to California where he married Maria Josefa Carrillo of Santa Barbara. In 1837, the  Rancho Nipomo was granted to Captain Dana by the Mexican governor. The Dana Adobe, created in 1839, served as an important stop for travelers on El Camino Real between Mission San Luis Obispo and Mission Santa Barbara. The adobe was a stage coach stop and became the exchange point for mail going between north and south in the first regular mail route in California. The Danas had several children, thirteen of whom reached adulthood. They learned both English and Spanish, as well as the language of the Chumash natives.

In 1846, U.S. Army Captain John C. Fremont and his soldiers stopped at the rancho on their way south to Santa Barbara and Los Angeles.  Captain Dana hosted a barbecue and gave Fremont's men 30 fresh horses. By the 1880s the Dana descendants had built homes on the rancho and formed a town. Streets were laid out and lots were sold to the general public. The Pacific Coast Railway (narrow gauge) came to town in 1882, and trains ran through Nipomo until The Great Depression in the 1930s. By the end of 1942, the tracks had been removed for the World War II war effort.

Thousands of Blue Gum Eucalyptus trees were planted on the Nipomo Mesa in 1908 by two men who formed the Los Berros Forest Company with the idea of selling the trees as hardwood. Groves of these non-native trees still exist in rows as they were originally planted.

Nipomo Mesa is the location of one of the most famous photographs of the Great Depression, "Migrant Mother", by Dorothea Lange.

Geography

Climate
This region experiences warm and dry summers, with no average monthly temperatures above 71.6 °F.  According to the Köppen Climate Classification system, Nipomo has a warm-summer Mediterranean climate, abbreviated "Csb" on climate maps.

Demographics

2020
At the 2020 census Nipomo had a population of 18,176. The population density was 1,205.7 inhabitants per square mile (434.5/km2). The racial makeup of Nipomo was 12,669 (69.7%) White, 327 (1.8%) African American, 218 (1.2%) Native American, 291 (1.6%) Asian, 50 (0.3%) Pacific Islander, 1,527 (8.4%) from other races, and 3,090 (17.0%) from two or more races.  Hispanic or Latino of any race were 9,233 persons (50.8%). 2,945 (16.2%) persons were 65 years or older and 4,791 (25.6%) were minors (under 18 years of age).

The census reported that 67.9% of the population lived in owner-occupied households with the average home value bring $594,800.  The Median gross rent from 2017 to 2021 was $1,640.

There were 5,667 households, 3,353 where the average household size was 3.25.

2010
At the 2010 census Nipomo had a population of 16,714. The racial makeup of Nipomo was 12,281 (73.5%) White, 177 (1.1%) African American, 200 (1.2%) Native American, 421 (2.5%) Asian, 33 (0.2%) Pacific Islander, 2,821 (16.9%) from other races, and 781 (4.7%) from two or more races. Hispanic or Latino of any race were 6,645 persons (39.8%).

The census reported that 16,703 people (99.9% of the population) lived in households, 11 (0.1%) lived in non-institutionalized group quarters, and no one was institutionalized.

There were 5,474 households, 2,258 (41.2%) had children under the age of 18 living in them, 3,353 (61.3%) were opposite-sex married couples living together, 686 (12.5%) had a female householder with no husband present, 326 (6.0%) had a male householder with no wife present.  There were 338 (6.2%) unmarried opposite-sex partnerships, and 49 (0.9%) same-sex married couples or partnerships. 807 households (14.7%) were one person and 346 (6.3%) had someone living alone who was 65 or older. The average household size was 3.05.  There were 4,365 families (79.7% of households); the average family size was 3.35.

The age distribution was 4,422 people (26.5%) under the age of 18, 1,531 people (9.2%) aged 18 to 24, 4,058 people (24.3%) aged 25 to 44, 4,593 people (27.5%) aged 45 to 64, and 2,110 people (12.6%) who were 65 or older.  The median age was 37.0 years. For every 100 females, there were 97.8 males.  For every 100 females age 18 and over, there were 94.9 males.

There were 5,759 housing units at an average density of 387.8 per square mile, of the occupied units 3,898 (71.2%) were owner-occupied and 1,576 (28.8%) were rented. The homeowner vacancy rate was 1.7%; the rental vacancy rate was 3.1%.  11,583 people (69.3% of the population) lived in owner-occupied housing units and 5,120 people (30.6%) lived in rental housing units.

2000
At the 2000 census there were 12,626 people, 4,035 households, and 3,316 families in the CDP. The racial makeup of the CDP was 75.9% White, 0.6% African American, 1.3% Native American, 1.4% Asian, 0.1% Pacific Islander, 16.0% from other races, and 4.7% from two or more races. Hispanic or Latino of any race were 34.6%.

Of the 4,035 households 41.4% had children under the age of 18 living with them, 66.9% were married couples living together, 10.9% had a female householder with no husband present, and 17.8% were non-families. 13.5% of households were one person and 6.6% were one person aged 65 or older.  The average household size was 3.13 and the average family size was 3.42.

The age distribution was 30.7% under the age of 18, 7.5% from 18 to 24, 27.9% from 25 to 44, 21.7% from 45 to 64, and 12.1% 65 or older.  The median age was 36 years. For every 100 females, there were 97.4 males.  For every 100 females age 18 and over, there were 93.2 males.

The median household income was $49,852 and the median family income  was $54,338. Males had a median income of $41,288 versus $25,509 for females. The per capita income for the CDP was $18,824.  About 5.6% of families and 7.3% of the population were below the poverty line, including 9.5% of those under age 18 and 6.1% of those age 65 or over.

Parks and recreation

The Dana Adobe is listed on the National Register of Historic Places. The entire Rancho Nipomo is listed as a California Historical Landmark.

Government

Education

Colleges and universities
Allan Hancock College, Santa Maria
Cuesta College, San Luis Obispo
California Polytechnic State University San Luis Obispo (Cal Poly)

School district
Lucia Mar Unified School District
Elementary
Nipomo Elementary (K-6) 190 E Price, Nipomo.  Attended primarily by students living east of US 101.
Dana Elementary (K-6) 920 W. Tefft St., Nipomo.  For students west of US 101 living nearby.
Dorothea Lange Elementary (K-6) 1661 Via Alta Mesa, Nipomo.  Attended by other Nipomo area students living west of US 101.
Middle school
Mesa Middle School (7th-8th) 2555 Halcyon Road, Arroyo Grande.  Located within original Rancho Nipomo boundaries.  Stresses character education, and competes in basketball, volleyball, wrestling, track, and soccer.  Also known for drama and music programs.
High school
Nipomo High School (9th-12th) 525 N. Thompson Road, Nipomo.  It was opened in 2002. Before that students attended Arroyo Grande High School.
Central Coast New Tech High School (9th-12th). Is a public charter school opened in 2012 with a freshman class. The school added a freshman class each year, reaching all four classes in the 2015–2016 school year.

Notable people
 Casey Alexander (b 1975) screenwriter (SpongeBob SquarePants, Uncle Grandpa)
 Akeem King (b 1992) is a former NFL player for the Atlanta Falcons and Seattle Seahawks.
 Mike Lamond (b 1987), more commonly known by his online alias Husky or HuskyStarcraft, is a former sports commentator, YouTuber, director, and voice actor.
 Jeff McNeil (b 1992), is a professional baseball player for the New York Mets.
 Leigh Rubin - creator of the syndicated comic strip Rubes
 Florence Owens Thompson (1903–1983) was an American woman who was the subject of Dorothea Lange's photograph Migrant Mother (1936)
 Don Siegel (1912–1991) was an American film and television director and producer

Infrastructure
The Nipomo Community Services District, a Special-purpose district, provides a majority of the town with water with the rest of the community being services by Golden State Water.

See also
 Guadalupe-Nipomo Dunes

References

External links

South County Chambers of Commerce

Census-designated places in San Luis Obispo County, California
1839 establishments in Alta California
1839 establishments in Mexico
Census-designated places in California